Yunshui  is a station on Line 1 of the Hangzhou Metro in China. It was opened on 24 November 2015, together with the expanded section of Line 1. It is located in the Qiantang District of Hangzhou.

References

Railway stations in Zhejiang
Railway stations in China opened in 2015
Hangzhou Metro stations